Jasenice may refer to:

 Jasenice, Zadar County, a village and municipality near Zadar, Croatia
 Jasenice, Dubrovnik-Neretva County, village in Konavle, Croatia
 Jasenice (Třebíč District), a village and municipality in the Czech Republic

See also 
 Jesenice (disambiguation)